Gal Shish (born 28 January 1989) is an Israeli former professional footballer.

He is of a Tunisian-Jewish descent.

Career
At international level, Shish was capped at levels from under-17 to under-21.

On 16 August 2012, Shish signed a two-years contract with Belgian Pro League side Waasland-Beveren. On 30 August 2013, Shish signed a three-years contract with Persha Liha side Volyn Lutsk. After two and a half years in Lutsk Shish came back to Israel to play for his youth club, Hapoel Tel Aviv FC.

References

External links
 

1989 births
Israeli Jews
Living people
Israeli footballers
Hapoel Tel Aviv F.C. players
S.K. Beveren players
FC Volyn Lutsk players
Hapoel Acre F.C. players
Maccabi Petah Tikva F.C. players
Hapoel Ironi Kiryat Shmona F.C. players
Israeli Premier League players
Ukrainian Premier League players
Israeli expatriate footballers
Expatriate footballers in Belgium
Expatriate footballers in Ukraine
Israeli expatriate sportspeople in Belgium
Israeli expatriate sportspeople in Ukraine
Footballers from Bat Yam
Israeli people of Tunisian-Jewish descent
Association football fullbacks